William Booth Hopper (August 26, 1891, Jackson, Tennessee – January 14, 1965, Allen Park, Michigan) was a Major League Baseball pitcher. He pitched parts of three seasons in the majors, from  until , for the St. Louis Cardinals and Washington Senators. He is buried in Browns Cemetery in Jackson, Tennessee.

External links

1891 births
1965 deaths
People from Jackson, Tennessee
Major League Baseball pitchers
St. Louis Cardinals players
Washington Senators (1901–1960) players
New Haven Murlins players
New Haven White Wings players
St. Paul Apostles players
Minneapolis Millers (baseball) players
Baseball players from Tennessee
Union Bulldogs baseball players